Timothy Michael Omundson (born July 29, 1969) is an American actor. He is notable for his supporting roles as Sean Potter on the CBS television series Judging Amy, Eli on the syndicated series Xena: Warrior Princess, Carlton Lassiter in Psych, King Richard on the musical series Galavant, and Cain in Supernatural.

Early life and education
Omundson was born in St. Joseph, Missouri, to a railroad worker father and teacher mother. After his family moved to Bellevue, Washington, he started studying theater at the age of twelve at the Seattle Children's Theater, and interned at various theaters during his high school years. With acting as his primary focus, he studied during the summer of his junior year in New York City at the American Academy of Dramatic Arts. For two years in a row, he was Washington State Debate Champion in Dramatic Interpretation.

With his father, Omundson spent a month traveling in Germany and Austria when he was 13 years old, a time he views as one of the most formative months of his life. After graduating from Bellevue, Washington's Interlake High School in 1987, Omundson went to the University of Southern California where he graduated with a Bachelor of Fine Arts in Theater. He won USC's Jack Nicholson Award and James and Nony Doolittle Award for outstanding achievements in acting.

Career

Omundson voices the character Aric Jorgan in the MMORPG Star Wars: The Old Republic. Aric Jorgan is the first companion for the Republic Trooper class. In 2014 Omundson had a guest role on The CW's Supernatural especially written for him, the role of the biblical Cain. He also played a major character in the 2006 series Psych where he portrayed Detective Carlton Lassiter. This also includes three television movies based on the series produced by the USA Network called Psych: The Movie in 2017, Psych 2: Lassie Come Home in 2020, and Psych 3: This Is Gus which was released in November of 2021.

He is also notable for his supporting roles as Sean Potter on the CBS television series Judging Amy, Eli on the syndicated series Xena: Warrior Princess, and King Richard on the musical series Galavant.

Personal life
Omundson lives in Los Angeles, California with his wife, Allison, and their two daughters born 2002 and 2004. In late April 2017 he suffered a major stroke. Among other issues, the stroke was reported to have impacted his walking ability, which he relearned. Despite his physical issues, Omundson was able to reprise his role as Carlton Lassiter with a small part in Psych: The Movie and more substantial roles in Psych 2: Lassie Come Home and Psych 3: This Is Gus while he continued his recovery. He also began a recurring role in This Is Us where he plays a recovered stroke survivor, Gregory.

Filmography

Film

Television

Video games

References

External links

1969 births
Living people
Actors from St. Joseph, Missouri
American male film actors
American male television actors
Male actors from Missouri
USC School of Dramatic Arts alumni
20th-century American male actors
21st-century American male actors